New Hamburg may refer to:

Places
In the United States
 New Hamburg, Missouri
 New Hamburg, New York
 New Hamburg (Metro-North station)
 New Hamburg, the original name for the Original Highlands neighborhood of Louisville, Kentucky

Elsewhere
 New Hamburg, Ontario, Canada
 Willyaroo, South Australia was known as New Hamburg until 1918

See also
 Hamburg
 Hamburgh (disambiguation)
 Novo Hamburgo, Brazil